The NTX Rayados are a soccer team based in Dallas,Texas that currently competes in North Texas Premier Soccer League.

History

NTX Rayados plays North Texas Premier Soccer Association, Division 1A since 2011. The team won the NTPSA Division 1A five times (Fall 2011, Spring 2012, Fall 2012, Spring 2013, Spring 2017). The NTX Rayados have played the Lamar Hunt U.S. Open Cup nine times, from 2011 to 2020.

Year-by-year

Honors
 NTPSA Division 1A (5) : Fall 2011, Spring 2012, Fall 2012, Spring 2013, Spring 2017

References

External links
Official Website

Association football clubs established in 2011
Soccer clubs in Texas
2011 establishments in Texas